Tajuria ogyges is a species of lycaenid or blue butterfly found in the Indomalayan realm (Burma, Thailand).

References

Tajuria
Butterflies described in 1895